William Lovett Anderson (10 April 1906 – 27 November 2004), was a decorated submarine commander during World War II who reached the rank of Rear Admiral in the United States Navy.

References

United States Navy rear admirals (lower half)
1906 births
2004 deaths